The South Face of Petit Grepon is a popular technical climbing route on the Petit Grepon in Colorado's Rocky Mountain National Park.  The South Face is recognized in the historic climbing text Fifty Classic Climbs of North America and considered a classic around the world.

References

External links 
mountainproject.com
summitpost.org
rockclimbing.com

Climbing routes
Rocky Mountain National Park
Mountaineering in the United States
Tourist attractions in Colorado